Xystocheir dissecta is a species of flat-backed millipede in the family Xystodesmidae. It is found in North America.

Subspecies
These three subspecies belong to the species Xystocheir dissecta:
 Xystocheir dissecta dissecta (Wood, 1867)
 Xystocheir dissecta microrama Shelley, 1996
 Xystocheir dissecta taibona Chamberlin, 1912

References

Further reading

External resources
PBS Digital Studios | Deep Look on YouTube : This Millipede and Beetle Have a Toxic Relationship

Polydesmida
Articles created by Qbugbot
Animals described in 1867